Kasthambadi is a village in Tamil Nadu in India,  located between Arni and Polur on the state highway to Thiruvannamalai. The village is well known for its temples, including the ancient Sivan temple. Places of interest near Kasthambadi include the Sathanur Dam, the Javadhu hills and Jamunamarathoor.

References

Villages in Tiruvannamalai district